The Sporting News Player of the Year Award is awarded annually by Sporting News to the most outstanding player in Major League Baseball. The honor was first given in 1936.

History
The Sporting News established in 1936 the Player of the Year award.  It is the oldest and most prestigious award given to the single player in MLB who had the most outstanding season.  Until 1969, it was the only major award given to a single player from MLB, rather than to a player in each league. In 1969, Baseball Digest began its Player of the Year award for one player in all of MLB. (The award became limited to position players in 1994, when Baseball Digest added a new award for "Pitcher of the Year.") In 1993, the first Best Major League Baseball Player ESPY Award was given. In 1998, the Major League Baseball Players Association (MLBPA) began its own Player of the Year award, for one player in all of MLB, as part of its Players Choice Awards. Baseball America also began its Major League Player of the Year award in 1998. In 2012, MLB's "GIBBY Awards" added an MLB Most Valuable Player category, which was renamed the Most Valuable Major Leaguer in 2014; its current name is the "Esurance MLB Awards" Best Major Leaguer.

Winners

Key

Awardees

Multiple wins

Players
Several players have won the award more than once. Ted Williams, Joe Morgan, Albert Pujols, Miguel Cabrera, and José Altuve are the only players to win the award in consecutive years.  Ted Williams won the award five times. Sandy Koufax is the only pitcher to win the award more than once.  Alex Rodriguez and Barry Bonds are the only players to win the award while playing with different teams. Stan Musial and Alex Rodriguez are the only players to win the award while playing different positions.  The only tie was in 1962, when Don Drysdale and Maury Wills shared the honor.  Alex Rodriguez and Barry Bonds are the only players to win the award with multiple teams.  Alex Rodriguez won the award with the most teams (3).

Winning multiple SN Player of the Year awards has been seen as guaranteed admission to the National Baseball Hall of Fame.  Barry Bonds is the only player with multiple awards, eligible for the Hall of Fame, but not a member of the Hall of Fame. The table is of the Players that have won two or more awards and the year they were inducted into Major League Baseball Hall of Fame.  Active players are not eligible for the Hall of Fame.

Outfielders and Pitchers have won the most awards.

Player of the Decade 
SN named Willie Mays as the player of the 1960s decade.  
SN named Mike Trout as the player of the 2010s decade.

See also
Players Choice Awards Player of the Year (in MLB; for all positions) (there are also Outstanding Player and Outstanding Pitcher awards in each league)
Baseball America Major League Player of the Year (in MLB; for all positions)
Best Major League Baseball Player ESPY Award (in MLB; for all positions)
"Esurance MLB Awards" Best Major Leaguer (MLB award for best player, including all positions) (also Best Hitter and Best Pitcher)
Baseball Digest Player of the Year (in MLB; for position players) (from 1969 to 1993, included all positions; in 1994, a separate Pitcher of the Year award was added)
Major League Baseball Most Valuable Player Award (in each league; for all positions)
Cy Young Award (MLB award for top pitcher in each league)
The Sporting News Most Valuable Player Award (in each league) (discontinued in 1946)
Baseball awards
List of MLB awards
SN Pitcher of the Year (replaced by Starting Pitcher and Relief Pitcher awards)
SN Starting Pitcher of the Year
SN Relief Pitcher of the Year
SN Rookie of the Year
SN Reliever of the Year
SN Comeback Player of the Year
SN Manager of the Year
SN Executive of the Year

References

Major League Baseball trophies and awards
Baseball most valuable player awards
Most valuable player awards
Awards by magazines
Awards established in 1936